Branko Vujović (born 20 April 1998) is a Montenegrin handball player for TSV Hannover-Burgdorf and the Montenegrin national team.

He represented Montenegro at the 2020 European Men's Handball Championship.

References

External links

1998 births
Living people
Sportspeople from Nikšić
Montenegrin male handball players
Vive Kielce players
Expatriate handball players in Poland
Montenegrin expatriate sportspeople in Poland
Montenegrin expatriate sportspeople in Slovenia
Mediterranean Games competitors for Montenegro
Competitors at the 2018 Mediterranean Games